Omar Simmonds Pea (born August 15, 1981, in Panama City) is a Panamanian judoka. He competed in the men's 81 kg event at the 2012 Summer Olympics and was eliminated in the second round by Joachim Bottieau.

References

1981 births
Living people
Sportspeople from Panama City
Panamanian male judoka
Olympic judoka of Panama
Judoka at the 2012 Summer Olympics